The National Iranian Gas Company (NIGC) was established in 1965 as one of the four principal companies affiliated to the Ministry of Petroleum of the Islamic Republic of Iran with 25,000 million Rials initial capital.

NIGC is responsible for the treatment, transmission, and delivery of natural gas to the domestic, industrial, and commercial sectors and power plants. The National Iranian Gas Exports Company (NIGEC) was created in 2003 to manage and to supervise all gas pipeline and LNG projects. Until May 2010, NIGEC was under the control of the NIOC, but the Petroleum Ministry transferred NIGEC, incorporating it under NIGC in an attempt to broaden responsibility for new natural gas projects.
As at 2012, 12,750 villages have been connected to gas network. NIGC does not play a role in awarding upstream gas projects; that task remains in the hands of the National Iranian Oil Company.

Main subsidiaries

The NIGC subsidiaries are:

 Iranian Gas Engineering and Development Company
 Iranian Gas Transmission Company
 Iranian Underground Gas Storage Company
 Iranian Gas Distribution Company
 Iranian Gas Commerce Company
 National Iranian Gas Export Company
 Provincial Gas Companies
 Gas Refining Companies

Technology

Iran is able to produce all the parts needed for its gas refineries. Iran plans to export its first LNG cargo by 2013. Iran is expected to launch its first gas to liquids (GTL) plant by 2018.

Development

In 2011, Iran’s net export of gas in 2010 was 1.57 billion cubic metres. In 2010, Iran’s exports and imports of natural gas were 8.42 and 6.85 billion cubic metres respectively. In 2010, Iran exported 0.4, 0.25, and 7.77 billion cubic metres of gas to Armenia, Azerbaijan and Turkey respectively. In terms of imports, Iran has received 0.35 and 6.5 billion cubic metres from Azerbaijan and Turkmenistan respectively.

Iran has approximately 29.6 trillion cubic meters of proven gas reserves which accounts for 16% of the world’s total reserves. This places Iran behind Russia with the second largest gas reserves worldwide. In 2009, Iran’s natural gas production stood at 116 billion cubic metres. In 2010, this number rose to 138.5 billion cubic metres which shows a 19% increase. Iran plans to boost its natural gas production by 200 million cubic meters until March 2016. Most of Iran’s gas is consumed domestically and has been increasing at an average annual rate of 12% for the past 15 years. Iran is seeking to reach a capacity of one million bpd of GTL-derived gasoline within the next decade.

In 2011, Iran signed a contract worth $10 billion with Baghdad and Damascus in order to export Iran’s gas to Iraq, Syria, Lebanon, the Mediterranean region and eventually Europe. It is estimated that in the next three to four years there will be an excess production of 200-250 million cubic metres of gas in the South Pars gas field, the largest worldwide gas field located in Persian Gulf.

The  liquefied natural gas (LNG) storage facility built in 2014 and named "Shourijeh" can supply 4.8 billion cubic metres of natural gas and aims to reduce gas imports from Turkmenistan.

See also

The nationalization of the Iran oil industry movement
Aghajari Gas Injection Project
Iran Natural Gas Reserves
South Pars Gas Field
North Pars Gas Field
Golshan Gas Field
Ferdowsi Gas Field
Kish Gas Field
Persian LNG
Iran LNG
Rhum gasfield

References

External links
 NIGC Official Website
 US Department of Energy - Iran's entry
 Iran oil and gas - Brief 2002 study

Gas Exporting Countries Forum
Government agencies established in 1965
Government-owned companies of Iran
Oil and gas companies of Iran
Iranian companies established in 1965
Energy companies established in 1965